Chateau d'Ax was an Italian professional cycling team that existed from 1983 to 1993, when it was succeeded by Team Polti. Among its various sponsors was Chateau d'Ax, an Italian furniture manufacturer.

References

External links

Cycling teams based in Italy
Defunct cycling teams based in Italy
1983 establishments in Italy
1993 disestablishments in Italy
Cycling teams established in 1983
Cycling teams disestablished in 1993